The Alfgang was a short-lived Danish automobile, manufactured in Silkeborg by M. Alfgang from 1912 to 1914.  Only two cars were built before World War I stopped production.  The cars used French-built engines from an unknown company.

References 

Brass Era vehicles
Vehicles of Denmark